William Burgat (died 1674) was an Irish Roman Catholic prelate who served as the Archbishop of Cashel from 1669 to 1675.

He was appointed the Vicar Apostolic of Emly on 17 April 1657 and Vicar Apostolic of Elphin on 24 November 1665. A few years later, he was appointed the Archbishop of the Metropolitan see of Cashel on 31 January 1669. His papal brief was issued on 8 March 1669 and consecrated in France circa August 1669. As Archbishop of Cashel, he continued to administer the Episcopal see of Emly as Apostolic Administrator.

He died in office on 27 April 1675.

Notes

References

 
 
 
 

Year of birth unknown
1675 deaths
Roman Catholic archbishops of Cashel
17th-century Roman Catholic archbishops in Ireland